Ertang Township (Mandarin: 二塘乡) is a township in Hualong Hui Autonomous County, Haidong, Qinghai, China. In 2010, Ertang Township had a total population of 8,244: 4,095 males and 4,149 females: 2,331 aged under 14, 5,394 aged between 15 and 65 and 519 aged over 65.

References 

Township-level divisions of Qinghai
Haidong